List of films produced or distributed by the American studio Grand National Pictures between 1936 and 1939. Originally known as Grand National Films, the company reorganized as Grand National Pictures in 1938. 

The company also handled a number of re-releases of earlier films, particularly those made by Chesterfield Pictures, which are not included. It also handled the American distribution of several British-made films.

Films

See also
 List of Producers Releasing Corporation films

References

Bibliography
 Slide, Anthony. The New Historical Dictionary of the American Film Industry. Routledge, 2014.

Grand National Films films
Grand National
Grand National